The Chantilly-Tiffany or Chantilly/Tiffany, also known as the Chantilly or the Foreign Longhair, is a breed of domestic cat which originated in North America.  The Chantilly was thought to be extinct but later rediscovered in 1960.

Appearance
The Chantilly-Tiffany has a semi-foreign body style and a full semi-long coat. The coat is silky, soft and smooth; the lack of undercoat usually makes grooming simpler than that of cats with an undercoat. The Chantilly-Tiffany is slow to mature and usually does not come into its full stature until about two years old. The eye color of the feline intensifies with age. The head should be a broad, modified wedge with gentle curves. It should have a medium length nose and a strong, broad, short, softly squared muzzle and defined but not obvious whisker pads.

The Chantilly-Tiffany originated in a chocolate color, but later on was accepted in a range of colors including chocolate, blue, cinnamon, lilac, and fawn. Accepted patterns were solid, mackerel, ticked, and spotted tabby. The color was rich; shading in solids may occur toward the underside. The overall impression of an ideal Chantilly was a semi-foreign cat of striking appearance resulting from the combination of its rich color and full, silky semi-longhair coat, plumed tail, contrasting neck ruff, and ear furnishings.

Eye color tends to be a very bright and clear yellow while the cat is young. As the cat ages, the color can become more golden.

Grooming 
Some Chantilly-Tiffanys are over-groomed. They tend to pull their own hair, which can lead to patches of baldness and the formation of digestive tract hairballs. To help prevent this, the cat should be brushed at least every other day to help control loose and shedding hair.

History

Official beginning (1960s–1970s)
The Chantilly/Tiffany breed had its official beginning as a "Foreign Longhair"; in 1967, Jennie Robinson (Neotype Cattery) of New York purchased a pair of semi-foreign longhaired chocolate cats with golden eyes in White Plains, New York. They may have had the same parents but were not litter-mates. "Thomas" was about a year of age upon purchase, and "Shirley" was around six months.

Shirley's first litter of six kittens was born in 1969. They all were a chocolate color and shared a similar appearance. Robinson initiated a breeding program to emphasize these traits. In the early 1970s, the ACA registered Thomas and Shirley, along with many of their descendants as "Foreign-Longhairs".

1970s–1980s
Robinson ended her breeding program in the 1970s. Sigyn Lund (Sig Tim Hil Cattery) a Florida Burmese breeder, purchased some of Robinson's kittens and took on the "Foreign Longhair" breeding program. The New York origin was not well known to the public at the time. Because of Lund's reputation as a Burmese breeder, It has been speculated that the Chantilly was a long haired Burmese. A change in the breed's name was requested by judges, because they felt the breed's current name "Foreign Longhair" was too general; the name "Mahogany" was suggested, but Lund changed the breed-name from "Foreign-Longhair" to "Tiffany" for the latter's feeling of elegance and class. Lund promoted the breed under "Tiffany". The ACA dropped the "Tiffany" from recognition, their reason being its rarity. As a result, all breed representatives registered under the Lund (Sig Tim Hil Cattery) name became unregistered and lost their pedigree status.

After this event, the breed continued to be advertised as "Burmese". At one point, in an informal phone interview, Sig Tim Hil Cattery supplied information to researcher Joan Bernstein regarding these chocolate cats. This interview resulted in a publication of information, again suggesting the possibility they were the product of UK crosses between Burmese and Himalayans (a Persian/Siamese cross). This information was posted in Harper's Illustrated Handbook of Cats. In The Ultimate Cat Book by David Taylor in 1989, the Tiffany's history was also described as "produced from crossing Burmese cats with Persians". The false advertisement and the phone interview could explain the tie to the Burmese in these books. The confusion led the breed to near-extinction.

Chantillys and Canadian/American teamwork (1980s–1990s)
Around the same time Robinson and Lund were developing the "Tiffany" in the United States, a Canadian acreage owner was surprised by a cat who appeared at his home in 1973. She was a long-haired, semi-foreign, chocolate, gold-eyed feline of unknown ancestry who gave birth to a litter of kittens. Once again these kittens were carbon copies of their mother, an experience shared by Robinson with the cats in her breeding program. Offspring of these were rescued by Canadian breeders in order to re-establish the "Tiffany" breed in North America with a cooperative effort with Robinson and Lund.

One major advocate of the Chantilly was Tracy Oraas, who began her involvement with the breed in 1988 when she responded to a classified ad advertising "chocolate kittens." Oraas got in touch with Siamese Oriental breeder Jan DeRegt, and Oraas and DeRegt undertook efforts to reestablish the breed after consulting a TICA judge. This judge expressed that nothing on the show bench compared with them. It took some major detective work, including calls to every veterinarian in Florida, but they managed to contact the Tiffany's original breeders, Robinson and Lund. Oraas and DeRegt also concluded that the Burmese breed was never used in any Tiffany breeding program. Their research did reveal that English breeders had crossed Foreign Longhairs (in an attempt to recreate an Angora-type cat). They suspect that the Tiffany may have been a product of these efforts. Since none of the original Chantillys could be found, they established the breed using registered European Angoras, Havana Browns, Abyssinians and Nebelungs.

In 1992, Oraas was asked to rename the breed because of possible confusion with the British Tiffanie. Wishing to preserve the elegance the "Tiffany" name represented, they chose "Chantilly."

Last Chantilly cattery (1990s–2000s)
Oraas bred "Chantilly/Tiffany" cats up to the early 2000s, then seems to have faded from the breeding scene. In 2001, there were a few catteries working with the Chantilly: one in Germany, one in Canada, one in Washington State, one in West Virginia and one in southern Illinois, known as Amorino Cattery. Anne Davenport-Parini started Amorino Cattery in 2001 when she brought Nugget (also known as LTD or Little Tabby Dude) of Emberhearth Cattery home to Illinois. By 2003, Amorino was the only Chantilly cattery in the U.S. still operating. Davenport-Parini was the last known Chantilly breeder in the US. LTD produced many kittens before his retirement.

Extinction (2000s–2010s)
In 2012, a fire destroyed Amorino Cattery and its archives. With the fall of Amorino Cattery, the breed was facing extinction. The last Chantillys known in the US were Frosty (grandson of LTD) and his daughter Acey. Frosty was shipped to a Nebelung breeder in Norway (Cacao Criadero Cattery). There was a struggle to get Frosty to breed to the Nebelung female, the exact reason for this being unknown. One kitten, Acey, was produced in the efforts. In 2015, the Norwegian breeder gave up on the Chantilly breeding program after the death of Frosty and fixed her female, Acey. As a result of this event, as far as it is known, the Chantilly is considered extinct.

References

External links

fanciers.com Chantilly
catster.com Chantilly-Tiffany pictures

Cat breeds
Cat breeds originating in the United States
Extinct cat breeds